Marina Núñez (born 1966) is a Spanish artist, and a professor at the University of Vigo. Her work is included in the collections of Museo Nacional Centro de Arte Reina Sofía in Madrid, Artium in Vitoria, MUSAC in Leon, Patio Herreriano in Valladolid, TEA in Tenerife, Fundación La Caixa, Fundación Botín, Corcoran Gallery of Art in Washington, DC, National Museum of Women in the Arts in Washington DC, Mint Museum of Art in Charlotte, North Carolina, Katzen Arts Center, American University Museum, in Washington DC, Fonds régional d'art contemporain in Corsica, France.

Education
Núñez has a bachelor of fine arts degree from the University of Salamanca, and a PhD in fine arts from the University of Castilla-La Mancha.

Career and work 

Her work was first exhibited in the early 1990s. Her depictions of madwomen. and female monsters revealed an interest in gender discourses -in deconstructions and propositions about women's identities, in the wake of what was one of the great discursive achievements of feminism of the 60th-70th and later.

Her oil painting, narrative and conceptual, progressively combined, from the first decade of 2000, with digital techniques in 2D and 3D, both still image and video. Simultaneously, new iconographies, related to the territory of science fiction and horror -without leaving behind references of the clinical imaginary and influences of certain moments in Art History as the Baroque or Surrealism- were consolidated in her images

Marina Núñez represents posthuman identities through images of mutant, mestizo, multiple bodies. In philosopher José Jimenez´s words, "the question of identity opens to the experience of metamorphosis: I am myself and my other. Body and image. Male and female. Rational and insane. Normal and monster. Native and foreign. Human being and machine. Earthling and alien."

Selected exhibitions

Solo
She has exhibited individually in significant public institutions such as: Museo Nacional Centro de Arte Reina Sofía in Madrid (1997), La Gallera in Valencia (1998), Pilar and Joan Miró Foundation in Mallorca (2000), Veronicas Church  in Murcia (2001), DA2 in Salamanca (2002), Casa de America in Madrid (2004), Cervantes Institute in Paris (2006), La Panera in Lleida (2008), MUSAC in León (2009), Centre del Carme in Valencia (2010), Sala Rekalde in Bilbao (2011), Patio Herreriano in Valladolid (2012), Sala Alcalá 31 in Madrid (2015), or Artium in Vitoria (2016), Es Baluard in Palma, Majorca (2017),  IVAM (2017, Valencia), Barjola Museum in Gijón (2017). Puertas de Castilla Center (2019, Murcia), TEA (2019, Tenerife), Sala Atín Aya (2019, Sevilla), Sala Kubo Kutxa (2021, San Sebastián), Museo Nacional Thyssen-Bornemisza (2021, Madrid)“.

Collective 
“Big Sur. Neue Spanische Kunst” (2002, Hamburger Banhof, Berlin), “Pain; passion, compassion, sensibility” (2004, Science Museum, London), “Banquet (nodes and networks)” (2010, ZKM, Karlsruhe, Germany), «Skin», (2010, Wellcome Collection, London), «Gender in art» (2015, MOCAK, Museum of Contemporary Art in Krakow, Poland), «Modelli Immaginari» (2017, Palazzo Riso, Palermo, Italy), «Naturel pas naturel» (2018, Palais Fesch, Musée des Beaux-Arts, Ajaccio, Corse, France), «Mind Temple» (2018, MOCA Museum of Contemporary Art, Shanghai),«The Time of the Chimeras” (2022, 59 Venice Biennale Arte Official Selection, Cameroon Pavilion, Palazzo Ca´ Bernardo).

References

External links 

 Official website

1966 births
Living people
20th-century Spanish women artists
21st-century Spanish women artists
Spanish feminists
Spanish painters
Spanish women painters
Feminist artists
Academic staff of the University of Vigo